Paweł Marcin Nastula (born 26 June 1970) is a Polish judoka and mixed martial artist. He was the 1995 and 1997 Judo World Champion, and 1996 gold medallist at the Olympic Games in Atlanta, Georgia, United States, winning those titles in the U95kg weight category.

Early career
Nastula was born in Warsaw, and started training Judo at the age of 10 at AZS AWF.

Judo
In addition to the 1996 Summer Olympics, Nastula won many European and World competitions, and was considered one of the top judo players in the world. Between February 1994 and March 1998 Nastula was unbeaten in Judo, having 312 consecutive wins over a period of those 1,220 days and winning every competition, a monumental feat. His winning streak snapped when the weight category was changed (from -95 kg to -100 kg).

He retired from the sport in 2004.

Mixed martial arts career
Nastula became interested in mixed martial arts after watching the first Hidehiko Yoshida and Royce Gracie bout in 2002. Shortly after, he signed up with Japanese promotion Pride Fighting Championship and was assigned to the Takada Dojo team, where he trained under Kazushi Sakuraba and other fighters in order to make the jump to the sport. Due to his record in judo, he was compared to Brazilian jiu-jitsu's Rickson Gracie.

Pride
Nastula received a very tough welcome to the PRIDE organization, as he was immediately pitted to face one of PRIDE's top heavyweight contenders and seasoned professionals in Antônio Rodrigo Nogueira. Due to his health and lack of experience, Nastula tried to negotiate a shorter fight with PRIDE Bushido rules and with both contenders wearing a gi, but Nogueira refused, so Pawel went for regular rules nonetheless. Nastula did well during the match, holding his own in the grappling exchanges for the first half of the round, but his inexperience was evident when Nogueira capitalized on his striking superiority, getting the upper hand in the mat with several knees to the head. After receiving a hard right hand, Nastula managed to get a takedown, but he was too tired to remain in the offensive role, and Nogueira found little resistance to unload ground and pound until the referee stop.

His second opponent would be perhaps an even tougher matchup, Alexander Emelianenko, sambo practitioner and brother of the legendary Fedor Emelianenko. The judoka performed better and controlled the earlier action both standing and on the ground, attempting armbars and taking Emelianenko's back, but his stamina played again against him. With his opponent tired, Alexander reversed him, took the mount and locked a rear naked choke for the submission.

In his third match in July 2006, he easily defeated the previously unbeaten MMA professional Edson Drago. Pawel threatened him with an inverted armbar from the bottom and later mounted him, throwing punches over the Brazilian and opening a cut in his eye. At the end, Nastula locked another armbar from the bottom and made Drago tap out.

Pawel's last fight in PRIDE would be against catch wrestler Josh Barnett in PRIDE 32: The Real Deal. The judoka again showed an excellent performance, taking down Barnett several times and landing effective left hooks, but Josh reversed him later in the match and executed a toehold to submit Nastula. It was later announced that he failed his NSAC-administered drug test.
Nastula tested positive for the banned substance nandrolone as well as banned stimulants phenylpropanolamine, pseudoephedrine, and ephedrine. Nastula has denied the veracity of the test results, however, claiming that the stimulants were absorbed into his system from over-the-counter supplements and that nandrolone, a mass-building substance, would not have been useful to him as he has not gained any muscle mass since coming to PRIDE. According to an interview by the website www.budo.pl, Nastula has hired lawyers to solve the situation.

World Victory Road
Following the fall of PRIDE, Nastula signed with World Victory Road and competed at Sengoku 4, losing via a controversial TKO to Yang Dong Yi. After Dong narrowly escaped an armbar attempt from the judoka, Nastula was unable to answer the referee's call to stand up, having received numerous strikes to the groin earlier in the fight. At that moment, Nastula indicated problems with his protective cup, but instead of ordering it to be checked up, the referee inexplicably halted the bout and declared Yang the winner by TKO.

Return to MMA

In 2008 Nastula was signed by a new promotion from Poland, MCC (Martial Combat Club) and was expected to face Koji Kanechika in their event in May. Unfortunately, the promotion folded and the event was cancelled.
Since then, Paweł was reported to be in talks with various promotions from Poland. KSW stated to be in talks with Nastula several times, changing its mind about the event he should participate in. For example, Paweł was reported to face Mariusz Pudzianowski at KSW XIII, which was later changed to KSW XIV. However, after losing to Tim Sylvia, Pudzianowski pulled out of that fight.

Despite many failed returns to the ring, and no bouts since the Sengoku loss from August 2008, Paweł remained active, running his club (Nastula Club) in Warsaw and training with fighters like Robert Jocz, Jan Błachowicz and Krzysztof Kułak.
However, after Pudzianowski's withdrawal from KSW XIV, Nastula stated in recent interviews, that he will retire if he won't get to fight in 2010.

In July 2010, Nastula signed with another new Polish promotion, Fighters Arena. Paweł made his anticipated comeback (and first ring appearance in Poland) at the inauginational show of the promotion in the Atlas Arena in Łódź, Poland, facing Yusuke Masuda (training partner of Hidehiko Yoshida) in the main event.
Nastula proved to be in shape, as he quickly knocked down his opponent and followed with a flurry of punches on the ground, forcing the referee to stop the bout early at 0:26 of the first round.

At KSW 24, Nastula competed to crown the first KSW Heavyweight champion against Karol Bedorf. He lost the fight due to exhaustion in the second round.

Personal life
Paweł is married and has two daughters.

For his sport achievements, he received the Knight's Cross of the Order of Polonia Restituta (5th Class) in 1996.

Nastula is the author of the book My Judo (2000), where he describes his favourite techniques and their combinations.

He took part in the 2009 Polish version of Dancing with the Stars, eventually finishing sixth overall.

Mixed martial arts record

|-
| Loss
| align=center| 5–6
| Mariusz Pudzianowski
| Decision (unanimous)
| KSW 29
| 
| align=center| 3
| align=center| 3:00
| Kraków, Poland
| Fight of the Night
|-
| Loss
| align=center| 5–5
| Karol Bedorf
| TKO (exhaustion)
| KSW 24
| 
| align=center| 2
| align=center| 2:25
| Łódź, Poland
| For KSW Heavyweight Championship.
|-
| Win
| align=center| 5–4
| Kevin Asplund
| Submission (americana)
| KSW 22
| 
| align=center| 1
| align=center| 2:33
| Warszawa, Poland
| 
|-
| Win
| align=center| 4–4
| Jimmy Ambriz
| Submission (hand injury)
| STC: Bydgoszcz vs. Torun
| 
| align=center| 1
| align=center| 1:50
| Bydgoszcz, Poland
| 
|-
| Win
| align=center| 3–4
| Andrzej Wronski
| TKO (punches)
| Wieczór Mistrzów
| 
| align=center| 1
| align=center| 1:09
| Koszalin, Poland
| 
|-
| Win
| align=center| 2–4
| Yusuke Masuda
| TKO (punches)
| FAL: Fighters Arena Lódz
| 
| align=center| 1
| align=center| 0:26
| Łódź, Poland
| 
|-
| Loss
| align=center| 1–4
| Yang Dongi
| TKO (exhaustion)
| World Victory Road Presents: Sengoku 4
| 
| align=center| 2
| align=center| 2:15
| Saitama, Saitama, Japan
| 
|-
| Loss
| align=center| 1–3
| Josh Barnett
| Submission (toe hold)
| Pride 32 - The Real Deal
| 
| align=center| 2
| align=center| 3:04
| Las Vegas, Nevada, United States
| 
|-
| Win
| align=center| 1–2
| Edson Claas Vieira
| Submission (armbar)
| Pride FC - Critical Countdown Absolute
| 
| align=center| 1
| align=center| 4:33
| Saitama, Saitama, Japan
| 
|-
| Loss
| align=center| 0–2
| Alexander Emelianenko
| Submission (rear-naked choke)
| Pride Shockwave 2005
| 
| align=center| 1
| align=center| 8:45
| Saitama, Saitama, Japan
| 
|-
| Loss
| align=center| 0–1
| Antônio Rodrigo Nogueira
| TKO (punches)
| Pride Critical Countdown 2005
| 
| align=center| 1
| align=center| 8:38
| Saitama, Saitama, Japan
|

Awards and titles

Judo
Olympic Games
1996 Atlanta 1st Prize (Gold Medal)
World Championships
1991 Barcelona 	2nd Prize
1995 Tokyo  	1st Prize
1997 Paris 	1st Prize
European Championships
1994-1996	1st Prize
1999 Bratislava	2nd Prize

Mixed martial arts
Konfrontacja Sztuk Walki
Fight of the Night (1 Time)
Streetfighters Team Cup
Streetfighters Team Cup Heavyweight Championship (1 Time)

References

External links
 
 Interview - PrideFC.com

1970 births
Living people
Polish male judoka
Olympic judoka of Poland
Judoka at the 1992 Summer Olympics
Judoka at the 1996 Summer Olympics
Judoka at the 2000 Summer Olympics
Polish male mixed martial artists
Heavyweight mixed martial artists
Mixed martial artists utilizing judo
Sportspeople from Warsaw
Olympic gold medalists for Poland
Polish sportspeople in doping cases
Doping cases in mixed martial arts
Olympic medalists in judo
World judo champions
Judoka trainers
Medalists at the 1996 Summer Olympics
20th-century Polish people